An Hye-jin (born 16 February 1998) is a South Korean professional volleyball player. She is a setter and a member of the South Korean National Team. On the club level, she plays for GS Caltex Seoul KIXX.

She was part of the South Korea women's national volleyball team at the 2020 Summer Olympics. The team finished at fourth place in 2020.

International career

National Team 
Summer Olympics
2020 – 4th Place
FIVB Volleyball Nations League
2018 - 12th Place
2019 – 15th Place
2021 – 15th Place

Awards
2020-21 Korean V-League - "Best Setter"

Filmography

TV Show
 Running Man – (guest, 572)
 Cool Kiz on the Block – (guest, 160)

References

External links
 

1998 births
Living people
South Korean women's volleyball players
GS Caltex Seoul KIXX players
Volleyball players at the 2020 Summer Olympics
Olympic volleyball players of South Korea
People from Asan
Sportspeople from South Chungcheong Province